Thomas Greenwood may refer to:

 Thomas Greenwood (activist) (1908–1988), American labor and Indian affairs activist
 Thomas Greenwood (historian) (1790–1871), English barrister and academic
 Thomas Greenwood (publisher) (1851–1908), English publisher
 Thomas B. Greenwood (1872–1946), Justice of the Supreme Court of Texas
 Thomas E. Greenwood (1859–1934), Canadian farmer, grain dealer and political figure
 Tom Greenwood (bishop) (1903–1974), Canadian Anglican bishop
 Tom Greenwood (footballer) (1889–1935), Australian rules footballer